Prozercon is a genus of mites in the family Zerconidae. There are more than 20 described species in Prozercon.

Species
These 28 species belong to the genus Prozercon:

 Prozercon achaeanus
 Prozercon aristatus Athias-Henriot, 1961
 Prozercon balikesirensis Urhan, 2008
 Prozercon banazensis Urhan, Karaca & Duran, 2015
 Prozercon bulbiferus Ujvari, 2011
 Prozercon carsticus Halaskova, 1963
 Prozercon davidi
 Prozercon denizliensis Urhan, 2002
 Prozercon dramaensis
 Prozercon erdogani Urhan, 2010
 Prozercon fimbriatus (Koch, 1839)
 Prozercon graecus Ujvari, 2011
 Prozercon karsticus Halaskova, 1963
 Prozercon kochi Sellnick, 1943
 Prozercon kunsti Halaskova, 1963
 Prozercon lutulentus Halaskova, 1963
 Prozercon masani
 Prozercon morazae Ujvari, 2011
 Prozercon norae
 Prozercon plumosus Calugar, 2004
 Prozercon rafalskii Blaszak, 1971
 Prozercon sellnicki Halaskova, 1963
 Prozercon stellifer Aoki, 1964
 Prozercon sultani Duran & Urhan, 2015
 Prozercon traegardhi (Halbert, 1923)
 Prozercon tragardhi Halbert, 1923
 Prozercon usheri Blaszak, 1985
 Prozercon yavuzi Urhan, 1998

References

Zerconidae
Articles created by Qbugbot